Joseph Chappell Hutcheson Jr. (October 19, 1879 – January 18, 1973) was a United States circuit judge of the United States Court of Appeals for the Fifth Circuit and previously was a United States district judge of the United States District Court for the Southern District of Texas.

Education and career

Born on October 19, 1879, in Houston, Texas, Hutcheson received a Bachelor of Laws in 1900 from the University of Texas School of Law. He entered private practice in Houston from 1900 to 1918. He was chief legal adviser to Houston from 1913 to 1917. He was Mayor of Houston from 1917 to 1918.

Federal judicial service

Hutcheson was nominated by President Woodrow Wilson on March 29, 1918, to a seat on the United States District Court for the Southern District of Texas vacated by Judge Waller Thomas Burns. He was confirmed by the United States Senate on April 6, 1918, and received his commission on April 6, 1918. His service terminated on January 26, 1931, due to his elevation to the Fifth Circuit.

Hutcheson was nominated by President Herbert Hoover on December 20, 1930, to the United States Court of Appeals for the Fifth Circuit, to a new seat authorized by 46 Stat. 538. He was confirmed by the Senate on January 13, 1931, and received his commission on January 26, 1931. He served as Chief Judge and as a member of the Judicial Conference of the United States from 1948 to 1959. He assumed senior status on November 4, 1964. He was the last appeals court judge who continued to serve in active service appointed by President Hoover. His service terminated on January 18, 1973, due to his death in Houston.

Other service

Hutcheson was also a member of the Anglo-American Committee on Displaced Persons that recommended in 1946 that Britain greatly increase the number of Jewish refugees it would let into Palestine.

See also
List of United States federal judges by longevity of service

References

Sources
 

1879 births
1973 deaths
Mayors of Houston
University of Texas School of Law alumni
Judges of the United States District Court for the Southern District of Texas
United States district court judges appointed by Woodrow Wilson
Judges of the United States Court of Appeals for the Fifth Circuit
United States court of appeals judges appointed by Herbert Hoover
20th-century American judges